C. A. Nothnagle Log House, also known as Braman-Nothnagle Log House, is a historic house on Swedesboro-Paulsboro Road in the Gibbstown section of Greenwich Township, New Jersey. It is one of the oldest surviving log houses in the United States.

The oldest part of the house was built sometime between 1638 and 1643 by Finnish or Swedish settlers in the New Sweden colony, and Nordic ironware from the 1590s is still extant around the fireplace. The fireplace, probably built of bricks brought over to North America as ship's ballast, is asymmetric and placed in a corner of the cabin.

The original cabin measures 16 by 22 feet, which indicates that the builders were relatively well off; an average sized dwelling of the period was 12 by 12 feet.  It is built of oak logs, and two logs were removable to provide ventilation in the summer.  The logs were double dovetailed to provide a close fit, and gravel was pounded between the chinks in the logs. No nails were used in the original construction; hardwood pegs were used as fasteners.  There is no ridgepole in the roof.  People lived in this part of the house until 1918.

A large addition to the original cabin was constructed in the early 18th century. A wooden floor was built over the original dirt floor around 1730. The house was added to the National Register of Historic Places in 1976 and is still privately owned. The cabin is opened for tours by appointment through the current owner, Doris Rink, who resides in the adjoining structure.

See also
List of the oldest buildings in New Jersey
List of the oldest buildings in the United States
National Register of Historic Places listings in Gloucester County, New Jersey

References

External links
Nothnagle Log Cabin

Greenwich Township, Gloucester County, New Jersey
Houses on the National Register of Historic Places in New Jersey
Houses in Gloucester County, New Jersey
Log cabins in the United States
National Register of Historic Places in Gloucester County, New Jersey
New Jersey Register of Historic Places
Log buildings and structures on the National Register of Historic Places in New Jersey
1685 establishments in New Jersey
Houses completed in 1685
Swedish migration to North America
Swedish-American history
Finnish-American history
Swedish American culture in New Jersey
Finnish-American culture in New Jersey
New Sweden